Union Grove is an unincorporated community in Bell County, in the U.S. state of Texas. According to the Handbook of Texas, only 4 people lived in the community in 2000. It is located within the Killeen-Temple-Fort Hood metropolitan area.

History
The area in what is now known as Union Grove today was first settled in the early 1900s with a store operating. The 1930s showed several scattered homes and one business in the community. The community continues to be featured on county maps, even though its only business shut down. Only 4 people lived there in 2000.

Geography
Stillhouse Hollow Lake, on the Lampasas River, is located to the north of the community.

Education
Union Grove had its own school in the 1930s and may have closed by 1990. Today, the community is served by the Salado Independent School District.

References

Unincorporated communities in Texas
Unincorporated communities in Bell County, Texas